Jan Schmidt (3 January 1934 – 27 September 2019) was a Czech film director. He directed sixteen films between 1960 and 1995. His 1969 film The Lanfier Colony was entered into the 6th Moscow International Film Festival.

Selected filmography
Joseph Kilian (1963)
Late August at the Hotel Ozone (1967)
The Lanfier Colony (1969)
The Bride with the Most Beautiful Eyes (1976)
Settlement of Crows (1978)
The Death of a Talented Cobbler (1983)
Lenin, Lord and Mother (1990)
Vracenky (1990)

References

External links

1934 births
2019 deaths
Film directors from Prague